Steady & Co., was a Japanese hip hop and music production group consisting of Kenji Furuya, Bots, both of Dragon Ash, Ilmari of Rip Slyme, and Shigeo of Skebo King.

Discography

Studio albums
(2001) Chambers

Singles
(2001) "Stay Gold"
(2001) "Shunkashūtō"
(2001) "Only Holy Story"

See also
Dragon Ash
Rip Slyme

Japanese pop music groups
Musical groups from Tokyo